Satya is a 1998 Indian Hindi-language crime film, produced and directed by Ram Gopal Varma; written by Saurabh Shukla and Anurag Kashyap. It stars J. D. Chakravarthy, Urmila Matondkar with Manoj Bajpayee, Saurabh Shukla, Aditya Shrivastava and Paresh Rawal. It is the first of Varma's Gangster trilogy about organised crime in India. The film follows Satya (Chakravarthy), an immigrant who comes to Mumbai looking for a job, befriends Bhiku Mhatre (Bajpayee) and is drawn into the Mumbai underworld.

Varma, initially planned to make an action film, but decided to make a film focusing on felonies after meeting some criminals. He hired Kashyap and Shukla to write the film, and opted to use lesser-known actors. The soundtrack and score were composed by Vishal Bhardwaj and Sandeep Chowta, respectively, while the lyrics were written by Gulzar. Its early cinematography was done by Gerard Hooper, who was replaced by Mazhar Kamran.

Satya was released on 3 July 1998 to critical acclaim, particularly for its realistic depiction of the Indian underworld. It was a commercial success, grossing , and helped launch a number of careers (especially for Kashyap and Bajpayee). The film won six Filmfare Awards and a National Film Award. Over the years, Satya has been regarded as a cult film, and is considered one of the greatest films ever made by a number of critics and scholars in Indian cinema. Film critic Rajeev Masand called it one of the most influential films of the past ten years. It inspired several sequels like Company (2002) and D (2005), and a direct sequel, Satya 2 (2013).

Plot
Satya (J. D. Chakravarthy) arrives in Mumbai in search of work and finds a job at a dance bar. Jagga (Jeeva), a criminal, throws the glass of whiskey that Satya prepared for him in his face because he dislikes the taste. Later another small time goon Pakya, (Sushant Singh), who works for Jagga, demands money from Satya. Satya refuses to pay and slashes Pakya's face with a razor. Pakya tells Jagga about the attack, and Jagga's goons beat Satya. A film producer is murdered by Bapu (Rajesh Joshi) and Vitthal Manjrekar (Sanjay Mishra) on the orders of Bhiku Mhatre (Manoj Bajpayee). Manjrekar is captured by police during the getaway and admits Mhatre's involvement to Inspector Khandilkar (Aditya Srivastava) during questioning; Mhatre is arrested.

Jagga makes fun of Satya when he is serving drinks; they fight, and he later frames Satya for procuring. Mhatre and Satya fight in prison, and Mhatre, impressed by Satya's courage, arranges his release through lawyer Chandrakant Mule (Makrand Deshpande). Satya is given a flat by Kallu Mama (Saurabh Shukla) and meets Vidya (Urmila Matondkar), his neighbour and an aspiring singer. Manjrekar denies any link to Mhatre in court, and Mhatre is released. With Mhatre's help, Satya shoots Jagga in the dance bar and joins Mhatre's gang. Malhotra (Mithilesh Chaturvedi), a builder whom Kallu Mama extorted, asks them to meet him for the money and Mhatre, Satya and the gang are ambushed. Under questioning, they admit to working for Guru Narayan (Raju Mavani). Vidya is initially rejected by music director Renusagar (Neeraj Vora), who later signs her for a project after Satya threatens him. Vidya and Satya begin a romantic relationship.

Guru Narayan arrives in Mumbai. Mhatre and his gang are ready to kill him but are forced to abandon their plan on orders from politician Bhau Thakurdas Jhawle (Govind Namdeo). Bhau asks him and Guru Narayan not to endanger his career with a gang war. Guru Narayan says (over the phone, to Bhau) that he wants to kill Satya to avenge Jagga's murder. This conversation is not heard by Mhatre, who (under Bhau's pressure), agrees to call it evens with Guru Narayan.

However, Satya later tells Mhatre that if they do not kill Guru Narayan, he will kill them. Mhatre gang, then kill Guru Narayan. This brings Mhatre and Satya in direct confrontation with Bhau. A new police commissioner, Amodh Shukla (Paresh Rawal), is appointed because of the increase in crime. In a strategic move, Bhau forgives Mhatre and his gang for their earlier actions. The police encounter a group of criminals, including Mhatre gang member Chander Khote (Snehal Dabi). At Satya's suggestion, Shukla is shot by his gang to alarm the police. Bhau wins the election by a landslide, thanks to Mhatre's help.

Satya and Vidya go to the cinema. When they step out for a drink during the intermission, Pakya sees Satya and informs the police. Inspector Khandilkar arrives and orders all the doors locked except one, expecting to apprehend Satya when he leaves the cinema through the single open door. Satya shoots a blank cartridge at the ground, creating a stampede, and escapes with Vidya. He is afraid of losing her after the incident, and Mhatre offers to move them to Dubai. Mhatre arrives at Bhau's house that night to celebrate his election victory with Kallu Mama and Chandrakant Mule, and the politician kills him for disobeying his order and killing Narayan. Satya tells Vidya he has a job in Dubai when the police arrive, and he is forced to escape. Vidya learns from Inspector Khandilkar that Satya is a criminal.

Satya arrives at Kallu Mama's residence. Mule orders Mama to kill Satya but Mama rebels and kills Mule instead, prompting the two to avenge Mhatre's murder. During Ganesh Chaturthi at a beach, Satya kills Bhau and is wounded. He and Mama leave; Mama plans to help Satya board a ship to Dubai, but Satya insists on going to Vidya's house first. Mama waits in the car while Satya knocks on her door. Vidya refuses to answer and, while they argue, Khandilkar arrives and shoots and kills Mama. Satya manages to break down Vidya's door, however, Khandilkar shoots him, and he collapses a few inches from her and dies.

Cast

J. D. Chakravarthy as Satya
Urmila Matondkar as Vidya
Paresh Rawal as Police Commissioner Amod Shukla
Manoj Bajpayee as Bhiku Mhatre
Saurabh Shukla as Kallu Mama
Govind Namdeo as Thakurdas Jhawle aka 'Bhau'
Makrand Deshpande as Advocate Chandrakant Mule
Shefali Shah as Pyari Mhatre
Raju Mavani as Guru Narayan
Aditya Srivastava as Inspector Khandilkar 
Neeraj Vora as Ronusagar (the music director)
Rajesh Joshi as Bapu
Sabir Masani as Yeda, Bhiku's Gang Member
Snehal Dabi as Chander Krishnakant Khote
Jeeva as Jagga Hyderabadi
Banerjee as Bhau Bodyguard
Jyotsna Karyekar as Vidya's Mother
Utkarsh Mazumdar as Vidya's father
Sanjay Mishra as Vitthal Manjrekar
Rajeev Mehta as Lawyer
Sushant Singh as Pakya
Manoj Pahwa as tabela owner
Anupam Shyam in a special appearance
Mithilesh Chaturvedi as Builder Malhotra
Shishir Sharma as Head of Inquiry Committee 
Arun Bali as  Home Secretary Mr. Sharma

Production

Development

Director Ram Gopal Varma, fascinated with Mumbai, wanted to return to making action films after a long break. While he was planning the film, Varma encountered some people from the underworld and became interested in their human side. Music producer and singer Gulshan Kumar was shot dead outside the Jeeteshwar Mahadev temple in Mumbai on 12 August 1997. Varma learned about the murder  from Jhamu Sughand, who had produced Rangeela. Sughand told Varma that Gulshan had awakened at about 7 am and told the producer he would meet a singer at 8 am and a friend at 8:30; he would then go to the temple and meet him afterwards. Varma then thought, "If Gulshan had woken up at 7 am, then at what time would the killer have woken up?" He then decided to make a film about gangsters and, as an Ayn Rand fan, wanted to "put Howard Roark in the underworld".

Varma had intended to leave songs out of the film, but " ... at that time it was very difficult to make a film without a song since the music companies were almost 'ruling the industry' and it was impossible to promote a song-less film". With a basic story in his mind, the director wanted Vijay Tendulkar to write the film's dialogue; he admired Tendulkar's work, particularly Ardh Satya (1983). However, Tendulkar was unable to work on Satya. The film was edited by a newcomer Apurva Asrani, who edited the trailer for Daud and Bhanodaya. Impressed by his work, Varma offered Apurva the editing position on Satya when he was nineteen years old. Varma incorporated several scenes from real life in the film including the scene were Mhatre abuses one of his dead friend on how he could die. One of his friends told him that his neighbor was a criminal whom he used to greet every day but could not guess that he was involved in crime. Varma liked this angle and used it in the film as well. Varma said that the characters in the film "are at a very low level of the gangster hierarchy". On the film's title, Varma said that he named it Satya for two reasons: one being a homage to Ardh Satya and the other one was a namesake girl whom he used to love in college who did not love him back.

Casting
A struggling Manoj Bajpayee auditioned for the role of Paresh Rawal's henchman in Daud, and Varma asked him if he had done any other film work; Bajpayee mentioned his supporting role in Bandit Queen. Varma, impressed by his performance in Bandit Queen, said that he wanted to give him a bigger role and advised him not to do Daud. However, Bajpayee wanted to appear in the film and Varma agreed. After filming was completed, Varma told Bajpayee that he regretted giving him a minor role and promised him a prominent role in his next film. Bajpayee suggested newcomer Anurag Kashyap's name to Varma for the screenplay. Varma liked Kashyap's Auto Narayan, and signed him to write the script. Although Kashyap was already writing the film, Varma felt that he needed a more experienced writer and asked Saurabh Shukla. Shukla was initially hesitant, since he wrote films he could direct. He went to Varma's office to decline, but the director told him that he wanted to cast him in the film and outlined the plot. Shukla then agreed to do the film, since he was "stuck" with the narration. They went to Varma's farmhouse in Hyderabad and wrote the first draft in a week without doing research, since Kashyap felt that a gangster's psychology is "very similar to anybody else". Bajpayee had never met any gangster in his life and was not good in speaking Marathi language, although he was playing a Maharashtrian character. He then decided to first work on his external look and grew a beard, a heavy face and curly hair. He took suggestions from his maid on how to get the nuances of the Marathi accent and worked on the character for three to four months before filming began.

Varma wanted to cast new actors in the film. He cast J.D. Chakravarthy, who had worked with Varma on Shiva (1990), in the title role. Chakravarthy said that he tried to imitate Varma to prepare for the role. The title role was initially planned for Bajpayee, but after the characters clarified for Varma he felt that he needed someone more fluent in Hindi for Bhiku Mhatre; Chakravarthy, a native Telugu speaker, was not sufficiently fluent in Hindi. Bajpayee was unhappy with the decision since he wanted to play the title role, but agreed to remain on the film because no other role was available. He based the character of Bhiku Mhatre on a person from his hometown who was a Jeetendra fan, wore coloured T-shirts and was short-tempered; he took the accent from his cook who was from Kolhapur. He also gathered his own costume from 25,000 given to him by the production. When Shukla and Kashyap were discussing authentic-sounding character names, an office boy named Bhiku came in, and they decided to use his name for a character. Although the female lead was initially offered to Mahima Chaudhary, but later replaced by Urmila Matondkar, with whom he had worked in Rangeela and Daud. Newcomer Sushant Singh was cast as Mhatre's henchman. Matondkar's costume was designed by Manish Malhotra.

Filming

Satya was filmed in Mumbai during the monsoon season. The scene where Sushant Singh's face is slashed by Chakravarthy was supposed to end there, but Varma forgot to say "cut" and the rest of the scene was improvised by the actors. The film's opening montage, when Chakravarthy arrives in the city, was given to Kashyap to shoot. He planned the scene and filmed it with the cinematographer. The scene was very different from what Kashyap had imagined because of his inexperience in filming. Varma instructed him to re-shoot it and taught him how to communicate with the cameraman. Several scenes in the film were improvised, including the entire death scene of Bhiku Mhatre.

Bajpayee, who has acrophobia, was apprehensive while filming a scene for two hours where he is standing at the edge of a cliff. Satya climactic scene was filmed during Ganesh Chaturthi, when the team recreated the Juhu beach with about 500 junior artists. The song "Kallu Mama" was filmed by Varma himself because the cinematographer was absent on the day of the shoot. The film's final scene to be shot, the song was largely improvised because the actors had been drinking. Satya was filmed in 50 days. The scene in the beginning of the film where Manjrekar and Bappu murder a film producer on a busy street was shot on a set; the street was created inside the studio, with parked cars belonging to the film crew. The first cinematographer was American Gerard Hooper, recommended to Varma by Kannan Iyer (who had written Daud). Hooper roamed Mumbai, filming the city even when no shooting was scheduled. However, he could not devote enough time to the project and left when it was thirty percent complete. Mazhar Kamran was the cinematographer for the rest of the film. According to Shukla, the film was shot on celluloid with "very low-light" and "low aperture."

Soundtrack

The film's soundtrack was composed by Vishal Bhardwaj, with lyrics by Gulzar. Sandeep Chowta composed the background score, which was released on the Venus Worldwide Entertainment label on 3 July 1998. The album has six tracks, including one instrumental. The film's 23-track background score was released as a separate album, Satya: The Sound, in November 1998. The singers were Lata Mangeshkar, Asha Bhosle, Suresh Wadkar, Mano, Hariharan and Bhupinder Singh.

It was the second soundtrack produced by the Gulzar-Bhardwaj collaboration; the first was Maachis (1996). An article in The Hindu on the art of film scoring mentioned Satya: "Interestingly (and hopefully) Indian films are just making a start with original soundtracks: Sandeep Chowta's background score for Ram Gopal Varma's 'Satya. According to Rediff.com, Satya "set the standards for background score" and the film's throbbing score "took the audience inside the mind of its characters. Every time a bullet was shot or there were close-ups of actors, one could hear the haunting score, which had a hallucinatory effect on the audience."

Release
A test screening of Satya rough cut was shown to 60 people at the Dimple theatre in Bandra. The response was negative; the audience thought the film advocated amorality, and portions of its second half were re-shot. Satya was released in India on 3 July 1998 on a commission basis, so distributors would not lose money. The film targeted an urban audience, and dubbed Telugu and Tamil-language versions were released in their regional markets. It was dubbed in English for screenings at international film festivals, with Vivek Oberoi dubbing one of the characters. Satya was part of the Indian Panorama section at the 1998 International Film Festival of India.

The Central Board of Film Certification retained its strong language and violence, since its members found them an integral part of the film. Satya received an A (adults-only) certificate, with no objections from the board. Star Plus acquired the film's satellite-telecast rights, and it was telecast on 26 December 1998 concurrently with theatres. Several cast and crew members attended the film's premiere at the Eros Cinema, where it received a good audience response. Its DVD was released on 22 September 2006.

Critical reception
Satya opened to praise from film critics. Shobhaa De wrote in her review, "Satya spoke the language of the streets-rough, crude, brutal. And yet, did not offend sensibilities. It perfectly captured the savagery of what has become our daily reality while also uncovering the final futility and pathos of mind-less gang wars." In his review, Khalid Mohammed wrote: "Satya is a gritty, hellishly exciting film which stings and screams. No one will go away from it unprovoked or unmoved." According to Anupama Chopra, "The maverick director ... has broken all Bollywood rules this time... Satya is an exercise in integrated aesthetics. It has a decidedly realistic feel and taut pacing." Suparn Verma of Rediff.com wrote, "Satya is a culmination of Ram Gopal Varma's work to date. His characters have the intensity and anger of Shiva, and the Urmila-Chakravathy relationship is better tuned version of what he did in Drohi". Another reviewer called to the film a "no punches pulled movie mirroring, authentically, the visage of a sick society."

Its retrospective reviews have also been positive. Jai Arjun Singh wrote, "Ram Gopal Varma shattered movie tastes with it, inventing a new language", and he called it his "favourite Indian gangster film". Raja Sen, giving the film a five-out-of-five rating, called Satya "... a visceral ride up the ranks of Mumbai's underworld, a film that influenced every gangster film after it, and one where all the elements-performances, characters, music, cinematography, action-came together very memorably indeed." At the 20 years of the film's release, Sukanya Verma 
wrote: "Shot in a blue-brown palette, the clever compositions - a mix of cool camera angles, hand-held view, long shots and noir lighting - capture the stifling complexity and conflicting emotions of its characters."

Box office
Satya earned  on fifteen screens in one week in Delhi and Uttar Pradesh, and the film benefited from the government of Maharashtra's entertainment tax exemption. It earned  in its second week, with a 97 percent occupancy rate in its third week. Satya ran for eleven weeks, when it earned . Declared a box-office hit, it was one of 1998's highest-grossing Indian films.

Accolades

 46th National Film Awards:

 Best Supporting Actor – Manoj Bajpayee

 44th Filmfare Awards:

Won

 Best Film (Critics) – Ram Gopal Varma
 Best Actor (Critics) – Manoj Bajpayee
 Best Actress (Critics) – Shefali Shah
 Best Background Score – Sandeep Chowta
 Best Editing – Apurva Asrani and Bhanodaya 
 Best Sound Design – H. Sridhar

Nominated

 Best Film – Ram Gopal Varma
 Best Director – Ram Gopal Varma
 Best Actress – Urmila Matondkar
 Best Supporting Actor – Manoj Bajpayee
 Best Supporting Actress – Shefali Shah
 Best Villain – Govind Namdev

Analysis
Although Satya is known for its realistic depiction of the Mumbai underworld, Varma has often said that his films do not glorify crime. In his book, Studying Indian Cinema, Omar Ahmed wrote that unlike American crime films (where success is measured by the accumulation of wealth), Satya is about individual survival; Ahmed called it a "post-modern gangster film." The title character's background remains a mystery throughout the film, and his and other characters' location in the city is unspecified. In her book Bombay Cinema: An Archive of the City, Ranjani Mazumdar wrote that Satya Mumbai resembles a "documentary montage of claustrophobic spaces" with "documentary-styled visuals".

The film's characters speak in a local, tapori dialect of Hindi. In his book, Lunch with a Bigot, Amitava Kumar wrote that Satya language of abuse "erupts more than the guns exploding". The authors of Locating Cultural Change: Theory, Method, Process compared the characters of Amod Shukla and Khandilkar to former Mumbai police commissioner Rakesh Maria. Varma used Sudhir Mishra's 1996 film, Is Raat Ki Subah Nahin, as a reference point for Satya.

Legacy
Satya is considered a modern masterpiece by several critics, and one of the best films of the 1990s. It has achieved cult status, and is cited as one of the best Indian gangster films for its realistic portrayal of violence; "paving the way" for future gangster films. Reviewing Varma's 2008 film, Contract, critic Rajeev Masand called Satya one of the most influential films of the past ten years. The film introduced a new genre, a variation of film noir which has been called "Mumbai noir". Satya was a breakthrough film for Manoj Bajpayee. Kay Kay Menon credited his role as a turning point for other method actors: "If it were not for Manoj's brilliant performance in Satya, actors like Irrfan and me might still be waiting to be accepted. Manoj opened the doors for us." His performance as Bhiku Mhatre (with his line, "Mumbai ka king kaun? Bhiku Mhatre"; "Who is king of Mumbai? Bhiku Mhatre") is considered one of the most memorable in Hindi cinema. Filmmaker Karan Johar placed Satya in his list of the 11 films that changed Bollywood forever, calling it "quite simply the mother of all underworld films."

Music director and composer Vishal Bhardwaj named his studio Satya Studio, after the film. Satya also gave 24-year-old writer Anurag Kashyap his Bollywood break: "I learnt everything to do with films while working with [Varma] on [Satya] and I still reflect in my movies what I learnt during the making of [the film]." Meghna Gulzar said that in the song "Kallu Mama", she could smell the beer on the character's breath. The film also propelled the career of editor Apurva Asrani, since it was his first. Reviewing Satya 2, critic Paloma Sharma wrote: "Satya 2 is as bad as Satya was good". Satya is also credited for a trend toward Hindi films with no stars, high concepts and low budgets. After seeing the film, Shah Rukh Khan told Chakravathy that if "you want to ruin this film, you should replace yourself with me in it". Amitabh Bachchan called Kashyap with praise. British director Danny Boyle cited Satya as an inspiration for his 2008 Academy Award-winning Slumdog Millionaire. Satya "slick, often mesmerizing" portrayal of the Mumbai underworld, which included gritty, realistic "brutality and urban violence," influenced Boyle's depiction of the Mumbai underworld.

Satya was on IBN Live's 2013 list of the 100 greatest Indian films of all time, in the 100 Filmfare Days series and on the "70 iconic movies of independent India" list. It was mentioned in Rachel Dwyer's 100 Bollywood Films (where she called it a "masterpiece"), and in critic and author Shubhra Gupta's 50 Films That Changed Bollywood, 1995-2015.

In 2021, critic Uday Bhatia wrote a book titled Bullets Over Bombay: Satya and the Hindi Film Gangster about the making of the film.

Sequels
Satya was the first film of Varma's Gangster series. It was followed by two other films – Company (2002) and D (2005) – and a sequel, Satya 2 (2013). Company, starring Mohanlal, Manisha Koirala, Vivek Oberoi and Ajay Devgn, was loosely based on Dawood Ibrahim's D-Company and received positive reviews. It was followed by D, starring Randeep Hooda and also produced by Varma, which was less successful than its predecessors. Satya 2 was a critical and commercial failure. According to Saibal Chatterjee, "Satya, the ultimate guns-and-gangs saga, was clearly in no need of re-interpretation."

References

Bibliography

External links
 

1998 films
1990s crime action films
Indian crime drama films
Films about organised crime in India
Films about corruption in India
Indian avant-garde and experimental films
Indian crime action films
1998 crime drama films
Indian crime thriller films
Indian gangster films
1990s Hindi-language films
Films set in Mumbai
Films directed by Ram Gopal Varma
Films featuring a Best Supporting Actor National Film Award-winning performance
Films scored by Vishal Bhardwaj
Fictional portrayals of the Maharashtra Police
Films with screenplays by Anurag Kashyap
1990s avant-garde and experimental films
1998 crime thriller films